Chester H. Pond  (March 26, 1844 – June 11, 1912) was an American inventor.  He invented many devices used in telegraphy.  In later life he was a railroad developer. He also founded the town of Moorhead, Mississippi.

Death 
Pond died at Moorhead on June 11, 1912.

References

Sources 

American people of English descent
American inventors
People from Medina, Ohio
People from Moorhead, Mississippi
People of Ohio in the American Civil War
Businesspeople from Mississippi
Businesspeople from Ohio
American city founders
Oberlin College people
1844 births
1912 deaths
19th-century American businesspeople
20th-century American businesspeople
19th-century American inventors